Emraan Hashmi (born 24 March 1979) is an Indian actor who appears in Hindi films.

He worked as a third assistant director for the 2001 and 2002 horror film Kasoor and Raaz for first installment for Raaz film Series before pursuing a career in acting. By 2003 , 2004,Emraan Hashmi early films include Footpath 
and Murder (2004), Zeher (2005), Aashiq Banaya Aapne (2005), Gangster (2006) and Tumsa Nahin Dekha (2004). However, he followed it with roles in films that underperformed at the box office before starring in the acclaimed drama Awarapan (2007).

The year 2008 marked a turning point for Hashmi, when he played a conman in the crime drama Jannat,an amazing movie. He subsequently gained recognition for portraying a range of unconventional characters in the horror film Raaz: The Mystery Continues (2009), the biographical drama The Dirty Picture (2011), the psychological thriller Murder 2 (2011), the romantic comedy Dil Toh Baccha Hai Ji (2011), the crime thriller Jannat 2 (2012
), and the supernatural thrillers Raaz 3 (2012) and Ek Thi Daayan (2013), all of which earned him critical appreciation. Hashmi's acclaimed performances in the underworld drama Once Upon a Time in Mumbaai (2010) and the political thriller Shanghai (2012), garnered him two Best Supporting Actor nominations at Filmfare. After appearing in another series of box office flops, he starred as the titular character in the biographical sports drama Azhar and an evil spirit in the horror thriller Raaz Reboot (both 2016) – and received praise for the drama Hamari Adhuri Kahani (2015), and  Baadshaho (2017).

In 2020, Amitabh Bachchan and Emraan Hashmi will be seen in the mystery thriller, Chehre, directed by Rumi Jaffery. In 2021, he will be seen in Sanjay Gupta's action crime film Mumbai Saga opposite John Abraham and in supernatural horror film Dybbuk. Hashmi's upcoming films include Selfiee, Tiger 3 and Jannat 3 and Awarapan 2

Films

Indian filmographies
Male actor filmographies

Television

Music videos

See also
 List of accolades received by The Dirty Picture

References

External links
 Filmography of Emraan Hashmi on IMDb